The women's 100 metres competition at the 2012 Summer Olympics in London, United Kingdom was held at the Olympic Stadium on 3–4 August.

In the preliminary round, Toea Wisil was the most impressive, winning with a relaxed 11.60 into a -1.6 mps wind, while Noor Hussain Al-Malki's Olympic experience lasted just the first steps out of the blocks before she pulled up.  Qualifying into the next rounds, Wisil beat triple world champion Allyson Felix and the rest of her heat out of the blocks and came with in .05 of reaching the semi-final round, from the previously unqualified preliminary round.  Carmelita Jeter ran hard for her second best time of the season to lead the round.  Her training partner Blessing Okagbare left an impression by outrunning Tianna Madison for the second best time.  Defending champion Shelly-Ann Fraser-Pryce exerted minimal effort to secure the fourth best qualifying time.

The semi-final round qualifiers was virtual mirror image of the previous evening's heats, the same top athletes with Jeter again posting a 10.83 and 11.01 the number 8 time.  Ezinne Okparaebo's Norwegian national record 11.10 left her two places out of qualifying.

In the final, Shelly-Ann Fraser-Pryce led from the gun.  She was quickest from the blocks with Jeter in close pursuit, and she ultimately leaned at the finish line for a narrow victory to defend her title. Veronica Campbell-Brown added to her career medal haul with the bronze medal.

Jeter's time was the fastest non-winning time in Olympic history.  In fact, all non-winning places 2-4 were the fastest for that place.  This was the second race in history to place 5 runners under 10.90 (the other being the 1992 Olympic final).  Only the third in history to place two under 10.80 (the others being the 1999 World Championships and the 2009 World Championships 100m final).

Competition format
The women's 100 m competition started with a preliminary round consisting of athletes who did not achieve the minimum qualifying standards. The top ten competitors from the preliminary round then joined the remaining competitors in the next round, the heats. The top 3 fastest competitors from each race of the seven heats qualified for the semifinals along with the three fastest overall non-qualifiers.  A total of eight competitors qualified for the final from the semifinals.

Records
, the existing World and Olympic records were as follows.

Schedule
All times are British Summer Time (UTC+1)

Results

Preliminaries

Qual. rule: first 2 of each heat (Q) plus the 2 fastest times (q) qualified.

Preliminary heat 1

Preliminary heat 2

Preliminary heat 3

Preliminary heat 4

Heats
81 entrants as of 27 July 2012.

Qual. rule: first 3 of each heat (Q) plus the 3 fastest times (q) qualified.

Heat 1

Heat 2

Heat 3
Wind:Heat 3: +1.5 m/s

Heat 4

Heat 5

Heat 6

Heat 7

Semifinals
Qual. rule: first 2 of each heat (Q) plus the 2 fastest times (q) qualified.

Semifinal 1

Semifinal 2

Semifinal 3

Final

References

Athletics at the 2012 Summer Olympics
100 metres at the Olympics
2012 in women's athletics
Women's events at the 2012 Summer Olympics